Sokol Point (‘Nos Sokol’ \'nos so-'kol\) is the narrow hilly point projecting 1.9 km into Darbel Bay on Loubet Coast in Graham Land, Antarctica.  It is formed by an offshoot of Sherba Ridge, and separates the glacier termini of Drummond Glacier to the east and Widdowson Glacier to the south.

The point is named after the settlements of Sokol in Northeastern and Southeastern Bulgaria.

Location
British mapping in 1976.

Maps
 Antarctic Digital Database (ADD). Scale 1:250000 topographic map of Antarctica. Scientific Committee on Antarctic Research (SCAR). Since 1993, regularly upgraded and updated.
British Antarctic Territory. Scale 1:200000 topographic map. DOS 610 Series, Sheet W 66 64. Directorate of Overseas Surveys, Tolworth, UK, 1976.

References
 Bulgarian Antarctic Gazetteer. Antarctic Place-names Commission. (details in Bulgarian, basic data in English)
Sokol Point. SCAR Composite Antarctic Gazetteer.

External links
 Sokol Point. Copernix satellite image

Headlands of Graham Land
Bulgaria and the Antarctic
Loubet Coast